Aminabad (also Romanized as Amīnābād; also known as Amini Abad) is a village in Galehzan Rural District, in the Central District of Khomeyn County, Markazi Province, Iran. At the 2006 census, its population was 44, in 13 families.

References 

Populated places in Khomeyn County